Thomas Playford may refer to:
 Thomas Playford I (1795–1873) aka Reverend Thomas Playford, non-conformist pioneer preacher in South Australia
 Thomas Playford II (1837–1915), Premier of South Australia, 1887–1889 and 1890–1892
 Thomas Playford IV (1896–1981), Premier of South Australia, 1938–1965

See also
 Playford family